Jānis Bordāns (born 21 June 1967) is a Latvian politician and lawyer, the Deputy Prime Minister and the Minister of Justice of the Republic of Latvia since January 2019, and previously from 2012 to 2014 .

Bordāns served as Minister of Justice in Valdis Dombrovskis' cabinet from July 2012 to January 2014, representing the National Alliance party. He later left the National Alliance and founded The Conservatives in May 2014, which he has led since then.

Led by Bordāns, the New Conservative Party won 16 seats in the 2018 Latvian parliamentary election, sharing the second place with another party in a fragmented parliament.

On 7 November 2018, Latvian President Raimonds Vējonis asked Bordāns to form a new coalition government and serve as the next Prime Minister of Latvia. Bordāns intended to form a five-party majority coalition, and he announced that his coalition will not include ZZS, a political alliance led by a Latvian oligarch Aivars Lembergs. However, other political parties wished to cooperate also with ZZS. Consequently, Bordāns did not reach an agreement with the coalition partners, and informed the President that he is unable to form the cabinet. In the following weeks, five parties agreed to form a coalition without ZZS, however, a compromise prime minister candidate from the smallest political party represented in parliament was selected.

Thus, in January 2019, Bordāns took office for a second term as Minister of Justice and the Deputy Prime Minister in the centre-right coalition cabinet of Arturs Krišjānis Kariņš.

Education
Bordāns graduated Riga Secondary School 39 in 1985. In 1992, he graduated from the University of Latvia and got a Master of Laws degree.

References

External links 
 Profile in web site of The Central Election Commission of Latvia
 CV in web site of Ministry of Justice of the Republic of Latvia

1967 births
Living people
People from Balvi Municipality
Latvian Way politicians
Civic Union (Latvia) politicians
National Alliance (Latvia) politicians
New Conservative Party (Latvia) politicians
Ministers of Justice of Latvia
Deputies of the 5th Saeima
Deputies of the 13th Saeima
20th-century Latvian lawyers
University of Latvia alumni